Rajuk Uttara Model College (RUMC) is a co-educational Bangladeshi secondary school (grades VI-XII) in Uttara, Dhaka about a kilometer north from Shahjalal International Airport. It was established in 1994. The school teaches its students in Bengali (morning & day) and English (morning & day) under the Bangladeshi national curriculum. Students are admitted into all grades according to the current availability of seats starting from sixth upto twelfth grade. The school has around 6000 students and employs more than 200 teaching staff and more than 100 other staff.

History

The main academic building was constructed in 1994 and the college was formally inaugurated during the 1994–95 academic year by the former prime minister of Bangladesh, Khaleda Zia. Due to a shortage of infrastructural facilities, further construction was taken up in 1995. This construction was completed in two phases and the campus took its present shape in 2001.

Admission
Admission to RUMC is competitive. Applicants have to pass a written test in order to qualify. Admission tests for the sixth grade are generally held in December and academic sessions begin in January. The admission procedure for the eleventh grade starts soon after the publication of results from the Secondary School Certificate (SSC) exam, with admission based on SSC exam results.

Academic performance

In 2008, the Dhaka Board of Education recognized RUMC for its performance on the HSC examinations. RUMC also received the Best School award in the National Debate Festival 2008.

References

External links

 Official RAJUK Uttara Model College website

Educational institutions of Uttara
High schools in Bangladesh
1994 establishments in Bangladesh
Educational institutions established in 1994
Private colleges in Bangladesh